The National Centre for Technology in Education (NCTE) was an Irish government agency established in 1988 to facilitate the development, funding and use of information and communications technologies in education in the Republic of Ireland. It also developed software for school computers which blocked websites deemed unsuitable for children or potentially harmful to a computer.
 
In 2012, the National Centre for Technology in Education was made defunct and its functions integrated into the Irish government's Professional Development Service for Teachers (PDST) as "PDST Technology in Education".

References

External links
 PDST Technology in Education

Educational organisations based in Ireland
Defunct government agencies of Ireland
Government agencies established in 1988
Government agencies disestablished in 2012
1988 establishments in Ireland
2012 disestablishments in Ireland